Enrico S. Corsetti (born January 13, 1963) is a former American football linebacker who played for the New England Patriots in the National Football League (NFL). He played college football at Bates College.

References 

1963 births
Living people
American football linebackers
Bates Bobcats football players
New England Patriots players